The Sikkim Gold Cup, known as the Sikkim Governor's Gold Cup, is an Indian football tournament held in Sikkim and organized by Sikkim Football Association (SFA). 
Past champions include New Road Team of Nepal in 2007, Three Star Club of Nepal in 2008. and ONGC FC in 2010. Mohammedan Sporting became the champions for 2016 beating Jhapa XI 1–0 in the final.

Venue
Most of the Sikkim Gold Cup matches used to played in the Paljor Stadium, Gangtok.

Results
List of winners and runners-up:

See also
Sikkim Premier League
Bhaichung Stadium

References

External links
 List of Sikkim Governor's Gold Cup Winners

 
Football cup competitions in India
Football in Sikkim
1986 establishments in Sikkim
Recurring sporting events established in 1986